The Laurel Springs School District is a community public school district that serves students in pre-kindergarten through sixth grade from Laurel Springs in Camden County, New Jersey, United States.

As of the 2021–22 school year, the district, comprised of one school, had an enrollment of 177 students and 15.4 classroom teachers (on an FTE basis), for a student–teacher ratio of 11.5:1.

The district is classified by the New Jersey Department of Education as being in District Factor Group "DE", the fifth-highest of eight groupings. District Factor Groups organize districts statewide to allow comparison by common socioeconomic characteristics of the local districts. From lowest socioeconomic status to highest, the categories are A, B, CD, DE, FG, GH, I and J.

For seventh and eighth grades, students from Laurel Springs attend Samuel S. Yellin Elementary School in Stratford as part of a sending/receiving relationship with the Stratford School District. As of the 2021–22 school year, Yellin School had an enrollment of 484 students and 41.5 classroom teachers (on an FTE basis), for a student–teacher ratio of 11.7:1.

For ninth grade through twelfth grade, public school students attend Sterling High School, a regional high school district that also serves students from Magnolia, Somerdale and Stratford, along with the sending districts of Hi-Nella and Laurel Springs. As of the 2021–22 school year, the high school had an enrollment of 897 students and 70.0 classroom teachers (on an FTE basis), for a student–teacher ratio of 12.8:1.

School
Laurel Spring School had 176 students as of the 2021–22 school year.
Ryan Mahlman, Principal

Administration
Core members of the district's administration are:
Ryan Mahlman, Superintendent
Erin Kearney, Business Administrator / Board Secretary

Board of education
The district's board of education, comprised of nine members, sets policy and oversees the fiscal and educational operation of the district through its administration. As a Type II school district, the board's trustees are elected directly by voters to serve three-year terms of office on a staggered basis, with three seats up for election each year held (since 2012) as part of the November general election. The board appoints a superintendent to oversee the district's day-to-day operations and a business administrator to supervise the business functions of the district.

References

External links
Laurel Spring School
 
Data for Laurel Spring School, National Center for Education Statistics
Stratford School District

Sterling High School

Laurel Springs, New Jersey
New Jersey District Factor Group DE
School districts in Camden County, New Jersey